Thomas or Tom Kelley may refer to:

Sports
Thomas Kelley (coach) (c. 1888–after 1922), American football and basketball coach
Tom Kelley (American football), American football coach at Framingham State University
Tom Kelley (baseball) (1944–2015), American baseball player

Others
Thomas P. Kelley (1905–1982), Canadian writer of pulp fiction
Thomas G. Kelley (born 1939), American naval officer
Tom Kelley (photographer) (1914–1984), American celebrity photographer

See also
Thomas Kelly (disambiguation)
Kelley (name)